Hungary has participated in all 19 editions of the FINA World Aquatics Championships, held since the first edition of 1973 World Aquatics Championships, winning 102 podiums, including 40 world titles, 31 silver medals and 31 bronze medals.

Swimming
All Hungarian medals till Gwangju 2019.

Water polo
All Hungarian medals till Gwangju 2019.

Men's team

1973 World Championship -  Gold medal
Balázs Balla, András Bodnár, Gábor Csapó, Tibor Cservenyák (GK), Tamás Faragó, István Görgényi, Zoltán Kásás, Ferenc Konrád, Endre Molnár (GK), László Sárosi, István Szívós Jr.; Coach: Dezső Gyarmati

1975 World Championship -  Silver medal
András Bodnár, Gábor Csapó, Tibor Cservenyák (GK), Tamás Faragó, István Görgényi, György Horkai, Ferenc Konrád, István Magas, Endre Molnár (GK), László Sárosi, István Szívós Jr.; Coach: Dezső Gyarmati

1978 World Championship -  Silver medal
Gábor Csapó, Tamás Faragó, Szilveszter Fekete, György Gerendás, György Horkai, György Kenéz, István Magas, Endre Molnár (GK), József Somossy, Attila Sudár, István Szivós Jr.; Coach: Dezső Gyarmati

1982 World Championship -  Silver medal
László Bors, Imre Budavári, Gábor Csapó, Tibor Cservenyák (GK), György Gerendás, György Horkai, György Kenéz, István Kiss, László Kuncz, Gábor Schmiedt, Attila Sudár, Sándor Tóth, János Varga; Coach: Mihály Mayer

1991 World Championship -  Bronze medal
Tibor Benedek, István Dóczi, Péter Kuna (GK), Csaba Mészáros, Gábor Nemes (GK), Imre Péter, Zsolt Petőváry, Gábor Schmiedt, Tibor Sprok, Frank Tóth, Imre Tóth, László Tóth, Balázs Vincze; Coach: János Konrád

1998 World Championship -  Silver medal
Tibor Benedek, Rajmund Fodor, Tamás Kásás, Gergely Kiss, Zoltán Kovács (GK), Zoltán Kósz (GK), Tamás Märcz, Tamás Molnár, Barnabás Steinmetz, Frank Tóth, Zsolt Varga I., Attila Vári, Balázs Vincze; Coach: Dénes Kemény

2003 World Championship -  Gold medal
Tibor Benedek, Péter Biros, Rajmund Fodor, István Gergely (GK), Tamás Kásás, Gergely Kiss, Norbert Madaras, Tamás Molnár, Barnabás Steinmetz, Zoltán Szécsi (GK), Tamás Varga, Zsolt Varga II., Attila Vári; Coach: Dénes Kemény

2005 World Championship -  Silver medal
Péter Biros, Rajmund Fodor, István Gergely (GK), Tamás Kásás, Csaba Kiss, Gergely Kiss, Norbert Madaras, Tamás Molnár, Ádám Steinmetz, Zoltán Szécsi (GK), Márton Szívós, Dániel Varga, Attila Vári; Coach: Dénes Kemény

2007 World Championship -  Silver medal
Tibor Benedek, Péter Biros, Rajmund Fodor, Tamás Kásás, Gábor Kis, Gergely Kiss (GK), Norbert Madaras, Tamás Molnár, Viktor Nagy, Zoltán Szécsi (GK), Márton Szívós, Dániel Varga, Dénes Varga; Coach: Dénes Kemény

2013 World Championship -  Gold medal
Bence Bátori, Krisztián Bedő, Attila Decker (GK), Ádám Decker, Miklós Gór-Nagy, Balázs Hárai, Norbert Hosnyánszky, Norbert Madaras, Viktor Nagy (GK), Márton Szívós, Dániel Varga, Dénes Varga, Márton Vámos; Coach: Tibor Benedek

2017 World Championship -  Silver medal
Attila Decker (GK), Ádám Decker, Balázs Erdélyi, Miklós Gór-Nagy, Balázs Hárai, Norbert Hosnyánszky, Krisztián Manhercz, Tamás Mezei, Viktor Nagy (GK), Béla Török, Dénes Varga, Márton Vámos, Gergő Zalánki; Coach: Tamás Märcz

Women's team

1994 World Championship -  Gold medal
Katalin Dancsa, Zsuzsanna Dunkel, Andrea Eke, Zsuzsanna Huff, Ildikó Kuna, Irén Rafael, Katalin Rédei, Edit Sipos, Mercédesz Stieber, Orsolya Szalkay, Krisztina Szremkó, Gabriella Tóth , Noemi Tóth; Coach: Gyula Tóth

2001 World Championship -  Silver medal
Katalin Dancsa, Rita Drávucz, Anikó Pelle, Ágnes Primász, Kata Rédei, Edit Sipos, Ildikó Sós, Mercédesz Stieber, Brigitta Szép, Krisztina Szremkó, Zsuzsanna Tiba, Ágnes Valkai, Erzsébet Valkai; Coach: Tamás Faragó

2005 World Championship -  Gold medal
Tímea Benkő, Fruzsina Brávik, Rita Drávucz, Patrícia Horváth, Dóra Kisteleki, Anikó Pelle, Krisztina Serfőző, Mercédesz Stieber, Orsolya Takács, Eszter Tomaskovics, Andrea Tóth I., Ágnes Valkai, Erzsébet Valkai; Coach: Tamás Faragó

2013 World Championship -  Bronze medal
Dóra Antal, Flóra Bolonyai, Barbara Bujka, Krisztina Garda, Anna Illés, Orsolya Kasó, Rita Keszthelyi, Dóra Kisteleki, Katalin Menczinger, Ibolya Kitti Miskolczi, Gabriella Szűcs, Orsolya Takács, Ildikó Tóth; Coach: András Merész

2022 World Championship -  Silver medal
Kamilla Faragó, Edina Gangl, Krisztina Garda, Gréta Gurisatti, Rita Keszthelyi, Dóra Leimeter, Alda Magyari, Geraldine Mahieu, Zsuzsanna Máté, Rebecca Parkes, Natasa Rybanska, Dorottya Szilágyi, Vanda Vályi; Coach: Attila Biró

Medal tables

By championships

By sport

By athlete

Only athletes with more than two gold medals

See also
 Hungary national swimming team
 Hungary national diving team
 Swimming World Championships medal table

References

External links
 Official site of the Hungarian Swimming Association  

 
Nations at the World Aquatics Championships
World Aquatics Championships
World Aquatics Championships